Xue Jiao (born January 30, 1993) is a Chinese footballer. She represented China in the football competition at the 2016 Summer Olympics. Xue also plays for Wuhan Jianghan University in the Chinese Women's Super League.

References

Chinese women's footballers
China women's international footballers
1993 births
Living people
Footballers at the 2016 Summer Olympics
Olympic footballers of China
Dalian Quanjian F.C. players
Chinese Women's Super League players
Women's association football defenders